Lester "Tre" Hayes III (born September 19, 1993) is a footballer who plays as a forward for Spanish Tercera Federación club El Palo FC. Born in the mainland United States, he represents the Puerto Rico national team. Besides the United States, he has played in Spain and Denmark.

Youth and college career
As a youth, Hayes played for MD Nike Rush and DeMatha Catholic High School. From 2011 through 2014 Hayes played college soccer for the UC Irvine Anteaters. Over that time he scored 12 goals in 79 appearances. His 79 appearances for the team is tied for 6th place in that category in program history. On February 4, 2013 he scored for the Anteaters in a 2–0 friendly victory over Real Salt Lake of Major League Soccer.

Club career
Hayes III started his career with OC Pateadores Blues of the Premier Development League. He tallied two assists in the opening match of the 2014 PDL season. That year he made eleven league appearances for the club, scoring one goal. He then moved to American fifth division side PSA Elite in 2014. That year he was part of the squad that advanced to the Third Round of the 2014 U.S. Open Cup by defeating LA Galaxy II. After that, he signed for ASC San Diego of the National Premier Soccer League, the country's fourth division, for the 2016 and 2017 seasons.

In 2017, Hayes made the move abroad and signed for a short spell with Spanish club Almuñécar City before moving to Cullar Vega CF, both of the Tercera Andaluza. During his first season in Spain, he scored a total of 20 goals in 18 league matches. His performance lead him to be signed by CD Alhaurino four tiers higher. After again impressing with 21 goals in 63 matches for the club, Hayes signed for El Palo FC for the 2020–21 season.

International career
Hayes made his senior international debut for Puerto Rico on 2 June 2021, in a 2022 FIFA World Cup qualification match against the Bahamas. After coming on as a 64th-minute substitute, he scored his first international goal for the team, the final tally of an eventual 7–0 victory.

International goals
Scores and results list Puerto Rico's goal tally first.

International career statistics

References

External links
 National Football Teams profile
 La Preferente profile
 

1993 births
Living people
Sportspeople from Savannah, Georgia
Puerto Rican footballers
Puerto Rico international footballers
American soccer players
American sportspeople of Puerto Rican descent
Association football forwards
CD Alhaurino players
American expatriate sportspeople in Spain
Expatriate footballers in Spain
Puerto Rican expatriate sportspeople in Spain
Puerto Rican expatriate footballers
Tercera División players
American expatriate soccer players
Soccer players from Georgia (U.S. state)